Live by Night is a crime novel by American writer  Dennis Lehane,  published in 2012. It won a 2013 Edgar Award for novel of the year.

Plot summary
By 1926, Prohibition in the United States gives rise to an endless network of underground distilleries, speakeasies, gangsters, and corrupt cops. Joe Coughlin, the youngest son of a prominent Boston police captain, defies his proper upbringing by climbing a ladder of organized crime that takes him from Boston to Ybor City, Florida, to Havana, Cuba, where he encounters a dangerous cast of characters who are all fighting for their piece of the American dream.

When the novel begins, Joe is in the employ of one of Boston's most powerful mobsters, Tim Hickey. Joe and two friends knock off a gambling room located behind a speakeasy. Unbeknownst to them, the speakeasy belonged to Albert White, their boss's biggest rival. Emma Gould, a server in the room and White's mistress, catches Joe's attention. They begin an affair.

Coughlin is later sent to Charlestown Penitentiary after a bank robbery goes awry. On the night of his arrest, the car Emma is traveling in crashes into a river and she is presumed dead. Joe comes under the protection of Italian mobster Maso Pescatore while in prison. While Joe and his police captain father, Thomas Coughlin, had a complicated relationship, Thomas agrees to do Pescatore's bidding to keep Joe safe in prison. The stress of these dealings gives Thomas a fatal heart attack.

Upon release, Pescatore sends Joe to Tampa, Florida, to solidify the family's rum-running operation. Joe builds a highly successful business with his henchman, Dion. Still grieving for Emma, he encounters a fiery Cuban expatriate and revolutionary, Graciela Corrales, upon arrival in Tampa and they become an intensely devoted couple. Graciela convinces Joe to mastermind the robbery of a weapons cache from an American warship to aid Fulgencio Batista's overthrow of Cuban strongman Gerardo Machado.

While building his empire, Joe fights against the Ku Klux Klan. The local chief of the Klan is related to Figgis, the Tampa police chief. Joe blackmails Figgis with pornographic photographs of the man's beautiful daughter Loretta in a drug-addled state, whom Figgis had believed was working in Los Angeles, California, as an actress. Figgis's daughter later returns to Tampa and becomes a famous preacher. Loretta later reveals to Joe that she does not believe in God and is merely performing. Loretta later commits suicide and it is revealed that she was sexually abused by her father.

When Pescatore decides to replace Joe in Florida with his own dimwitted son, Albert White uses this opportunity to seek revenge against Joe, whom he blames for Emma's death. Joe escapes and regains control of his empire.

Joe, his wife, Graciela, and their small son return to her homeland of Havana, Cuba, to live a quieter life. Dion becomes head of the family while Joe acts as an advisor. While in Cuba, Joe meets Emma outside the brothel where she works. She reveals she was involved in Joe's arrest. When Joe and Graciela return to the United States for a visit, Graciela is shot and killed by Figgis. Joe turns his back on organized crime to live a more mundane life with his son.

Film adaptation

Warner Bros. produced a film adaptation with Ben Affleck directing, writing, producing, and starring as Joe Coughlin, while Leonardo DiCaprio and Jennifer Davisson Killoran served as producers. The film was released on December 25, 2016 and received mixed reviews from critics.

References

External links
 Dennis Lehane on Live By Night, His Novel of Prohibition Era Rum Runners
 Author's website
 Publisher's website

2012 American novels
American crime novels
Edgar Award-winning works
English-language novels
Novels about organized crime in the United States
Novels about prohibition in the United States
American novels adapted into films
Novels by Dennis Lehane
Novels set in Boston
Novels set in Cuba
Novels set in Florida
William Morrow and Company books